Irwin Peter Russell (16 September 1921 – 22 January 2003) was a British poet, translator and critic. He spent the first half of his life—apart from war service—based in Kent and London, being the proprietor of a series of bookshops, editing the influential literary magazine Nine and being part of the literary scene.  Bankruptcy and divorce led to several years of travel which took him to Berlin, Venice, British Columbia and Iran, amongst other places.  After the Iranian Revolution he settled permanently in Italy, where he spent the rest of his life. He lived in considerable financial hardship and throughout all he lived a life dedicated to poetry.  His work never became mainstream, but it is highly regarded in some circles.

Biography
Russell was born in Bristol and educated at Malvern College. During World War II he served in the Royal Artillery as an intelligence officer in India and Burma, he left the army with the rank of major. After the war, he studied English at Queen Mary College, London. He left without taking a degree.

In 1948 Russell set up an "Ezra Pound Circle" which met once a fortnight in a London pub. Arthur V. Moore encouraged him, passing on advice from Pound: "E.P. thinks you might do as he used to half a century ago ... arrange to be at a given eating place at a given hour each week ... It must be cheap enough so anyone can afford it, and at a place where such a gathering would be made comfortable." That summer Russell went to Italy and met Olga Rudge at Siena, met Pound's friend John Drummond in Rome, and visited Rapallo where he met D. D. Paige who was staying in Pound's old flat engaged in the arduous task of compiling the first selection of Pound's letters.

In 1951 Russell married Marjorie Keeling-Bloxam.  Her brother-in-law was Albion Harman, son of the self-proclaimed King of Lundy, the largest island in the Bristol Channel.  In the 1950s Russell often visited Lundy, and enjoyed bird-watching there.

In 1949 Russell founded the literary magazine Nine (named after the Nine Muses) which in its eleven issues published many notable poets including George Barker, Basil Bunting, Roy Campbell, Ronald Duncan, Paul Eluard, William Empson, David Gascoyne, Robert Graves, Michael Hamburger. The following year he started The Pound Press. Russell published work by Pound's friends, An Examination of Ezra Pound (1950), but also the first English translations of Mandelstam, Pasternak and Borges. Russell ran the Grosvenor Bookshop in Tunbridge Wells from 1951 to 1959. Both Nine and the Pound Press ceased operation in 1956, and later that year Russell met the young William Cookson and in 1958 introduced him to Krystyna and Czesław Bednarczyk of The Poets' and Painters' Press and suggested that Cookson found his own journal, which was to be the long-running Agenda. Russell introduced him to the works of Hugh MacDiarmid and Tom Scott. Cookson saw Agenda as in part a continuation of what Russell had done with Nine. In 1995 Agenda brought out one of its dedicated issues: 'A Tribute to Peter Russell'.

In 1959 the Grosvenor Bookshop went out of business, and he opened the Gallery Bookshop in Soho, London. He finally went bankrupt in 1963 and with the collapse of his marriage, he moved to Berlin.  In 1965 he relocated to Venice. He had rooms in the Campo de la Bragola.

In the mid 1970s he held a writing fellowship as poet in residence at the University of Victoria in British Columbia, where he met his second wife, Lana Sue Long, who was around 30 years his junior. Two daughters, Kathleen and Sara, were born to the couple in 1975 and 1976. After leaving Canada, the family moved to Tehran, where Russell taught and studied at the Imperial Academy of Philosophy.  Their third child, a son, Peter George, was born there in 1977. They remained in Iran until the 1979 revolution, when they returned to Italy, where they lived together under considerable financial hardship.  In 1989 Lana returned with the three children to North America, settling in Jackpot, Nevada, and the couple divorced in the 1990s. Tuscany was Russell's home for the last forty years of his life. In 1983 he moved into an old mill — "La Turbina" — in Pian di Scò, in the Valdarno near Arezzo.  Life at the mill was rudimentary, and there was hardly any furniture, although there were thousands of books in a variety of languages, and a supply of whisky and cigarettes. Russell essentially lived in the kitchen, the most habitable and only warm room of the house.

From 1990 he began editing the Marginalia Newsletter, which appeared alternately in English (odd numbered issues) and Italian (even numbered issues). In the early 1990s he began working with his son, now a teenager, on the translations in his bilingual collections of his poems.

In April 2001 serious health problems associated with a gastric ulcer led to three months in hospital, followed by a further three months in a sanatorium for the elderly. Around this time he became effectively completely blind.

Russell translated varied works from several European languages, he also worked in Persian and Arabic; he was the first English translator of Osip Mandelstam. His close friends included Kathleen Raine and Leonello Rabatti. He was a cousin of Bertrand Russell

He died in the hospital at San Giovanni Valdarno, only 15 minutes or so by car from Pian di Scò.

Work
Dana Gioia has described Russell as "a poet of striking contradictions. He is an immensely learned writer with an anti-academic temperament, a Modernist bewitched by classicism, a polyglot rooted in demotic English, an experimentalist in love with strict traditional forms, a natural democrat suspicious of the Left, and a mystic committed to clarity."

Works

Poetry
 Picnic to the Moon, The Fortune Press, London, 1944
 Omens and Elegies, Hand and Flower Press, Aldington, 1951
 Descent, (private edition), Tunbridge Wells, 1952
 Three Elegies of Quintilius, The Pound Press, Tunbridge Wells, 1954
 Images of desire, Gallery Bookshop, London, 1962
 Dreamland and Drunkenness, Gallery Bookshop, London, 1963
 Complaints to Circe, London, 1963
 The Spirit and the Body. An Orphic Poem, Keepsake Press, London, 1963
 Visions and Ruins, St. Albert's Press, Aylesford, Kent, 1964
 Agamemnon in Hades, St. Albert's Press, Aylesford, Kent, 1965
 The Golden Chain: Lyrical Poems 1964–1969, (private edition) Venice, 1970
 Paysages Légendaires, Enitharmon Press, London, 1971
 The Elegies of Quintilius, Anvil Press, London, 1975 & 1996
 Ephemeron. A Commonplace Book. An Epic Poem, Lafayette, Indiana (USA), 1977
 Theories, Crescent Moon Press, Teheran (Iran), 1977
 Act of Recognition: Four Visionary Poems, Golgonooza Press, Ipswich, 1978
 Malice Aforethought or the Tumor in the Brain. Epigrammata, University of Salzburg, 1981
 Elemental Discourses, University of Salzburg, 1981
 Africa: A Dream, private edition, Venice, 1981
 All for the Wolves: Selected Poems 1947–1975, Anvil Press Poetry, London, 1984 and Black Swan, Redding Ridge, Connecticut, 1984
 Quintilii Apocalypseos Fragmenta, Agenda Editions, London, 1986
 Teorie e Altre Liriche, Carlo Mancosu Editore, Rome, 1990
 Metameipseis Noerai, or Intellectual Transformations, Agenda Editions, London, 1991
 Pratomagno. Nine Poems, private bilingual edition, translated by Pier Franco Donovan and the author, Pian di Scò, 1992, reprinted 1994
 The Pound Connection in some poems, mainly uncollected or unpublished, private edition, Pian di Scò, 1992
 A Progress of the Soul – Un progresso dell'anima – Five Poems, Pian di Scò, 1992 (private edition) reprinted in 1993 as a bilingual edition translated by Pier Franco Donovan and the author
 Le Poesie di Manuela, private bilingual edition, Pian di Scò, 1992
 Fiddlesticks – Legnetti per il fuoco – Quintilii Apocalypseos Fragmenta, private bilingual edition, translated by Pier Franco Donovan and the author, Pian di Scò, 1992
 The Duller Olive: Early poems uncollected or previously unpublished 1942–1959, University of Salzburg, 1993
 Nove Poemi/Nine longer poems, private bilingual edition, translated by Pier Franco Donovan and the author, Pian di Scò, 1993
 A False Start: London Poems 1959–1963, University of Salzburg, 1993
 Due Poesie del ritorno – Two Poems of Return, private bilingual edition, translated by Pier Franco Donovan and the author, Pian di Scò, 1993
 Ten Days at Neumarkt, private edition, Pian di Scò, 1993
 Some Poems, private edition, Pian di Scò, 1993
 Sonnet, private edition, Pian di Scò, 1993
 Africa. Un sogno – A dream, private bilingual edition, translated by Peter George Russell and the author, Pian di Scò, 1993
 50 Gedichte von Peter Russell: zweisprachige Ausgabe. Deutsche Ueberstzungen von Charles Stunzi, private bilingual edition, Pian di Scò, 1994
 Berlin-Tegel 1964: Poems and Translations, University of Salzburg, 1994
 My wild heart – Il mio cuore selvaggio, private bilingual edition, preface by Leonello Rabatti, translated by Pier Franco Donovan and the author, Pian di Scò, 1994–1996
 Venice poems 1965, University of Salzburg, 1995
 Three quests – Tre cerche, private bilingual edition, translated by Peter George Russell & Leonello Rabatti, Pian di Scò, 1995
 More for the wolves, University of Salzburg, 1997
 Omens and elegies – Descent – Visions and ruins – Agamemnon in Hades, University of Salzburg, 1997
 From the apocalypse of Quintilius – Selected and introduced by Glyn Pursglove, University of Salzburg, 1997
 Paysages legéndaires and acts of recognition, University of Salzburg, 1997
 Towards an unknown life – LI Sonnets, Bellowing Ark Press, Seattle, Washington (USA), 1997
 Language & the spirit in age of Antichrist, Temenos Academy, London, 1997
 My wild heart, University of Salzburg, 1998
 La Catena d'oro – The Golden Chain, bilingual edition, preface by Giuseppe Conte, translated by Peter George Russell, Pier Franco Donovan & the author, Paideia, Firenze, 1998
 Sei poesie recenti – Six recent poems, Edizioni De Filippis, translated by Peter George Russell, Arezzo, 1998
 Considerazioni sul Fragmentum Filippinum 2993 (Quintilii Elegidion e Villa in Tuscis) – Vitam Reddere ad Asses,  Edizioni De Filippis, Arezzo, 1998
 Poesie dal Valdarno – Poems, bilingual edition, translated by Peter George Russell, Pier Franco Donovan, Roberto Marchi & the author, preface by Franco Loi, Pietro Chegai Editore, Florence, 1999
 Effetti di luce ed altre poesie – Effects of light, bilingual edition, translated by Peter George Russell & the author, Edizioni Dialogolibri, Como 1999
 Sonnets – A provisional text January–August 1999, private edition, Pian di Scò, 1999
 La sorgente prosciugata – The dried-up spring, bilingual edition translated by Peter Gorge Russell & the author, Edizioni Eva, Venafro (IS), 2000
 Sonetti – Settembre-Ottobre 1998 – Al fumo delle candele, translated by Peter George Russell & the author, Salvatore Sciascia Editore, Caltanissetta-Rome, 2000
 Albae meditatio, poemetto, translated by the author & Pier Franco Donovan, edizioni Noialtri, Messina, 2000
 Sonetti – Autunno 1998, private bilingual edition, translated by Peter George Russell & the author, Pian di Scò, 2000
 Metameipseis Noerai, o delle trasformazioni intellettuali – Metameipseis Noerai, or intellectual transformations, translated by Roberto Marchi, La bottega di poesia Fernando Pessoa, Anno IX, n. 42, Novembre 2001, Sesto San Giovanni (MI),
 Scalare l'Olimpo – Scaling Olympus, bilingual edition, preface by Brandisio Andolfi, translated by Peter George Russell, Pier Franco Donovan & the author Pietro Chegai Editore, Florence, 2001
 A Savannah da nonno Peter, translated by Peter George Russell, Joseph Canzio & the author, Edizioni De Filippis, Arezzo, 2001
 Autumn to autumn (Sonetti 1997–1998), bilingual edition, preface by Enrica Salvaneschi, translated by Peter George Russell & the author, Edizioni Il Foglio, Piombino, 2002
 Long evening shadows – Le lunghe ombre della sera, 16 poesie tradotte da Franca Alaimo, Edizioni Il Foglio, Piombino, 2002
 Living death – Vivere la morte, bilingual edition, preface and translation by Franca Alaimo, Paideia, Florence, 2002
 This is not my hour. Studio e traduzione dai "Sonnets" bilingual edition, translation by Raffaello Bisso, edizioni del Foglio Clandestino, Sesto San Giovanni (MI), 2010.

Prose
 Preliminary notes on the political and economic ideas of Ezra Pound, private edition, London, 1948
 "Elements or ingredients of poetry" and "Imagination": two addresses on poetry, private edition, Pian di Scò, 1991
 'Ezra Pound and the cantos' – lecture given at the British Council, Naples, edition private Pian di Scò, 1991
 Vision in the poetry of Ezra Pound or, Ezra Pound and the invisible, private edition, Pian di Scò, 1991
 Ezra Pound, great poet, great friend, conference held at the Petrarch Academy of Arezzo 20 March 1991, private edition, Pian di Scò 1991
 Dante and Islam, private edition, Terranuova Bracciolini, 1991
 Five addresses on poetry, private edition, Pian di Scò, 1991
 Tolkien and the Imagination, private edition, Pian di Scò, 1991
 Kossovo like cosmic symbol – a speech given in occasion of the encounter of October of the union of the writers of the Republic of Serbia, Belgrade 1989, private edition, Pian di Scò, 1991
 The image of woman as a figure of the Spirit, Four lectures given at the Carl Gustav Jung Institute, Zurigo, 1991, private edition, Pian di Scò, 1991, then published in editions of the University of Salzburg, 1992
 Celestial assumption: four conferences on Dante and Islam, private edition, Pian di Scò, 1992
 Dante and Islam – a general introduction, four conferences held in 1991, private edition, Pian di Scò, 1992
 Poetic asides I, University of Salzburg, 1992
 Quiintilii Apocalypseos Fragmenta – Introduction, private edition, Pian di Scò, 1992
 Poetry and meaning – Preamble to a selection of lyrical poems for the Freies Gymnasium, Basel (October 1990), private edition, Pian di Scò, 1992
 Vitalism or abdication, private edition, Pian di Scò, 1992
 The exile – from the United Kingdom – 1st Dantesque International Conference (9–10 October 1992, Poppi, Arezzo), from the title it "In the track of Dante; the exile and the writers of the 1900s", private edition, Pian di Scò, 1992
 Campagna, verde campagna, private edition, Pian di Scò, 1992
 Avant-propos ad una lettura delle proprie poesie, private edition, Pian di Scò, 1992
 In the tradition – a British writer living in Italy – An address given to Sarah Lawrence University and Richmond College, Florence, March 1991, private edition, Pian di Scò, 1992
 'New poetry from Italy' – a review of the anthology "New Italian poets" edited by Dana Gioia & Michael Palm (Story Linens Press, Brownsville, USA, 1991), private edition, Pian di Scò, 1992
 Poetic asides II, University of Salzburg, 1993
 Two notes on Caio Gracco, private edition, Pian di Scò, 1993
 Shelley, Plato and Thomas Taylor – a lecture given at the International Bicentenary Conference on Percy Bysshe Shelley at the University of Salzburg (September–October 1992), private edition, Pian di Scò, 1993
 La visione pavesiane del 'Moby Dick' di Melville  – conference held in 1993 near the Municipality of Terranuova Bracciolini, private edition, Pian di Scò, 1994
 Something about poetry – Selected lectures and essays by Peter Russell edited by Glyn Pursglove, University of Salzburg, 1997

References

Bibliography
 Burns, Richard, 'The Poet Odyssified' – a biographical essay
 Burns, Richard, Obituary, The Independent, 28 January 2003.
 Carpenter, Humphrey, A Serious Character': The Life of Ezra Pound, Faber and Faber, 1988. .
 Cookson, William, 'E.P. and Agenda: Autobiographical Fragments' in Sons of Ezra: British Poets and Ezra Pound, edited by Michael Alexander & James McGonigal, Rodopi, 1995, 
 McIntyre, Dennis (editor) International Who's Who in Poetry and Poets' Encyclopedia International Biographical Centre, Routledge, 2001 , 
 Pursglove, Glyn, Obituary, 'The Guardian, 15 April 2003
 Pursglove, Glyn, Obituary in Acumen'' 46, May 2003.
 Defelice, Domenico, "La vita come poesia, Peter Russell e il Pratomagno", Pomezia-Notizie, Roma, agosto 2017, pp. 1–7.

External links
 Peter Russell site
 History of Agenda
 Letter dated September 2001.
 Peter Russell fonds at University of Victoria, Special Collections
  Peter Russell – site Sinopiarte Italy

1921 births
2003 deaths
English literary critics
Writers from Bristol
People educated at Malvern College
English male poets
20th-century English poets
20th-century English male writers
English male non-fiction writers
British Army personnel of World War II
Royal Artillery officers
British people in colonial India
British people in British Burma